I Am King is an album by Code Orange.

I Am King may also refer to:

I Am King, Sean John fragrance by Sean Combs
I Am King, American band formerly on Rise Records
I Am King, mixtape in the Trae tha Truth discography
"I Am King", song by Forgotten Rebels
"I Am King", song by Erinn Williams from Music on The Shield
"I Am King", song by MFGrimm from You Only Live Twice: The Audio Graphic Novel